Mickey 17 is an upcoming American science fiction film written, directed, and co-produced by Bong Joon-ho, based on the 2022 novel Mickey7 by Edward Ashton. It stars Robert Pattinson, Naomi Ackie, Steven Yeun, Toni Collette, and Mark Ruffalo. 
It is set to be released by Warner Bros. Pictures on March 29, 2024.

Premise 

Feature adaptation of the science fiction novel by Edward Ashton follows the story of Mickey 17, an "expendable," who is a disposable employee on a human expedition sent to colonize the ice world Niflheim. After one iteration dies, a new body is regenerated with most of his memories intact.

Cast 

 Robert Pattinson as Mickey Barnes 
 Naomi Ackie as Nasha
 Steven Yeun as Berto
 Toni Collette as Gwen
 Mark Ruffalo as Hieronymous Marshall

Production 

A film adaptation of Edward Ashton's novel Mickey7 was announced to be in development in January 2022, with Bong Joon-ho writing, directing, and producing for Warner Bros. Pictures. Robert Pattinson was in talks to star in the film at the time of the announcement. Pattinson was confirmed to star in May 2022, with Naomi Ackie, Toni Collette, and Mark Ruffalo joining the cast. In July, Steven Yeun was added to the cast.

Production began at Warner Bros. Studios, Leavesden on August 2, 2022 and concluded in December 2022.

Release 

Mickey 17 is set to be theatrically released on March 29, 2024, by Warner Bros. Pictures.

See also 

 Moon, 2009 film with a similar premise

References

External links 

 

Upcoming films
2020s American films
2020s English-language films
2024 films
American science fiction films
Films based on science fiction novels
Films directed by Bong Joon-ho
Films produced by Bong Joon-ho
Films shot at Warner Bros. Studios, Leavesden
Films with screenplays by Bong Joon-ho
Warner Bros. films